UWR may refer to:
 
 Underwater rugby, an underwater sport invented in Germany during the 1960s
 United Western Recorders, a recording studio complex in Hollywood, California
 University of Wrocław, a public, research university in Wrocław, Poland